James Nicholson House may refer to:

James Nicholson House (Lakewood, Ohio), listed on the National Register of Historic Places in Cuyahoga County, Ohio
James Nicholson House (Charleston, South Carolina), NRHP-listed

See also
Nicholson House (disambiguation)